XHAVO-FM (101.5 MHz) is a radio station in Río Bravo, Tamaulipas, Mexico, serving Reynosa, Tamaulipas and McAllen, Texas. It is owned by 
Radio United and known as Digital 101.5.

History
The concession for XHAVO was obtained by Edilberto Huesca Perrotín on February 22, 1992. In 1998, the station was sold to Grupo ACIR; ACIR sold XHAVO to an affiliate of Border Media Partners in 2004, and when BMP sold its Rio Grande Valley stations, XHAVO was included in the sale to R Communications, LLC.

External links
 Official website
 Query the FCC for XHAVO

References

Spanish-language radio stations
Radio stations in Reynosa
Radio stations established in 1992
1992 establishments in Mexico